Real is a barangay in the city of Calamba. It is also where the new Calamba City Hall and the Rizal Monument are located.

Industrial Park 

This barangay is one of the most important in the city like some barangays in Calamba are; Canlubang, Batino and Milagrosa. The barangay is a known location of Light Industry and Science Park of the Philippines II, an industrial park in the city.

Neighboring Barangays

Population

Notable spots 
 268 Shopping Mall (Real Road)
 Calamba Terminal via (Canlubang)
 Calamba City Hall
 Meralco Calamba Branch
 Rizal Monument
 Saint Benilde International School (Main)
 SM City Calamba
 Walter Mart Calamba

See also 
 Calamba Premiere International Park

Notable people 
 Jeric Gonzales, actor and one of the grand winners on Protégé
 Thea Tolentino, actress and one of the grand winners on Protégé

Gallery

References

External links
Official Website of the Provincial Government of Laguna

Barangays of Calamba, Laguna